The 2009–10 Dukat Premijer Liga season is the nineteenth since its establishment and second in the Premier league format.

Teams

League table

2009-10 winning team

RK Croatia Osiguranje Zagreb
GK: Marin Šego, Gorazd Škof, Ivan Pešić, Luka Bumbak
LB: Tonči Valčić, Nikola Spelić, Jakov Gojun
CB: Domagoj Duvnjak, Denis Špoljarić, Josip Valčić, Ivano Balić
RB: Kiril Lazarov, Marko Kopljar
RW: Mirza Džomba, Zlatko Horvat, Luka Raković
LW: Ljubo Vukić, Manuel Štrlek
LP: Frank Løke, Zoran Lubej, Gyula Gal, Marino Marić
Head coach: Nenad Kljaić
Source: eurohandball.com

References

Sources
HRS
Sport.net.hr
Rk-zamet.hr
Rijeka.hr

Croatian Premier Handball League seasons
2009–10 domestic handball leagues
2009 in Croatian sport
2010 in Croatian sport